Stegea sola is a moth in the family Crambidae. It is found in North America, where it has been recorded from southern Texas.

References

Moths described in 1972
Glaphyriinae